Podonidae is a family of onychopods in the order Diplostraca. There are about 8 genera and at least 20 described species in Podonidae. A lot of them are non-native species, many of which pose a great threat to aquatic ecosystems.

Genera
 Caspievadne
 Cornigerius
 Evadne Lovén, 1836
 Pleopis
 Pleopsis Dana, 1853
 Podon Lilljeborg, 1853
 Podonevadne
 Pseudevadne Claus, 1877

References

Further reading

 
 
 
 

Cladocera
Crustacean families